John Bock (born 1965 in Schenefeld, Germany) is a German artist. He studied in Hamburg, Germany and lives and works in Berlin.

Work 
Bock is a multi-media artist primarily known for his performances. Since 1991, he creates environments hand crafted from found materials which function as symbolic settings for his "lectures." More recently there has been an increased production of film and video work.

In his "lectures", Bock acts on "stages" built from tables, cupboards or multi-level wood constructions. The objects are handmade or re-modeled accessories of the lecture, made out of clothing, electrical equipment such as hoovers and mixers, or "plastic diagrams" that illustrate his mathematical explanations. After the lecture, they are left on the stage which thus forms a "theatrical collage". The "lectures" are structured by different scenes in which Bock sometimes works with (non-professional) actors; frequently he plays pop songs or classical pieces from a record player. The lecture is mostly recorded on video. The film is then integrated in the installation, documenting the lecture throughout the exhibition.

Bock has been professor for sculpture at the Academy of Fine Arts of Karlsruhe since 2004.

Exhibitions 
Bock participated in numerous international exhibitions, among others the Venice Biennial (1999 and 2005) and the documenta 11 in Kassel (2002). He has also had solo exhibitions in a number of international institutions including MoMA and the New Museum in New York, Kunst-Werke Institute for Contemporary Art in Berlin, Kunsthalle in Basel, Secession, Wien, and the Institute of Contemporary Arts in London.

He has participated in various group shows including Martian Museum of Terrestrial Art, Barbican Centre, London, and "Laughing in a Foreign Language", The Hayward Gallery, London, both in 2008. John Bock: Maltreated Frigate, a monograph of his work, was published by Walther Koenig Ltd, 2007.

Bock is represented by Galerie Klosterfelde, Berlin, Anton Kern Gallery, New York, and Regen Projects, Los Angeles.

Selected exhibitions

Germany

Europe

Americas

Asia + Oceania

Lectures 
 2000: Four Lectures, Museum of Modern Art, New York
 “Aller Anfang ist Merz – von Kurt Schwitters bis heute”, Sprengel Museum, Hannover, Germany, 6 June
 Gribbohm meets Mini-Max society, (lecture 4, MoMA N.Y.C.)
 thread waxing space, “death race”, Brooklyn, Dec.
 2009: Lecture / Fashion Show The greased bendsteering in the luggage gets tangled up with the white shirt (in German: Die abgeschmierte Knicklenkung im Gepäck verheddert sich im weissen Hemd) at HKW, Haus der Kulturen der Welt, Berlin, Germany

See also 
Robecchi, Michele, "John Bock: A Man in Space", Flash Art, January–February, 2005, p. 92-95.
Galloway, David, "Spray the Ketchup, Fling the Lettuce", ARTnews, May, 2006
Coulson, Amanda, "John Bock", Frieze, Issue 111, November–December, 2007
O'Reilly, Sally, "John Bock: Hide and Seek", Art Review, 2007, p. 52-59.
Millard, Coline, "John Bock", Modern Painters, July 15, 2010
Smith, Roberta, "Art in Review: John Bock", The New York Times, April 2, 2010
Tsitsovitis, Yannis, "John Bock's Unorthodox Machines", Under/Current Magazine Vol. 6, 2011, p. 144-149.

References

External links 
John Bock at Anton Kern Gallery
John Bock at Galerie Klosterfelde, Berlin
John Bock at the Berliner Poster Verlag
John Bock at Sadie Coles HQ
John Bock at Fondazione Nicola Trussardi
Lecture / Fashion Show The greased bendsteering in the luggage gets tangled up with the white shirt at HKW, Haus der Kulturen der Welt, Berlin, Germany VernissageTV Video September 2009.

Living people
1965 births
German contemporary artists
Artists from Schleswig-Holstein